John Parry Foster (born February 26, 1963) is a sailor from the US Virgin Islands who competed at three Olympics (1984, 1988 and 1992) in the two-person keelboat class. His sailing partner at the Olympics was his father John Foster Sr.

References

External links
 
 
 

1963 births
Living people
United States Virgin Islands male sailors (sport)
American male sailors (sport)
Olympic sailors of the United States Virgin Islands
Sailors at the 1984 Summer Olympics – Star
Sailors at the 1988 Summer Olympics – Star
Sailors at the 1992 Summer Olympics – Star